Biaktea Lalbiakhlua (born 11 August 1988) is an Indian professional footballer who plays as a midfielder for Aizawl in the I-League on loan from Mizoram Police.

Career
Born in Mizoram, Lalbiakhlua started his career with Dinthar of the Mizoram Premier League before joining Mizoram Police. While with Mizoram Police, he represented Mizoram in the winning Santosh Trophy side in 2014. Lalbiakhlua then joined newly promoted I-League side, Aizawl, in the summer of 2015 on a season-long loan.

He made his professional debut for Aizawl on 16 January 2016 against Bengaluru FC. He started the match and played 79 minutes as Aizawl lost 0–1.

Career statistics

References

External links 
 Aizawl Football Club Profile.

1988 births
Living people
Indian footballers
Aizawl FC players
Association football midfielders
Footballers from Mizoram
I-League 2nd Division players
I-League players